Quintet in E flat for Piano and Winds  may refer to:

Quintet for Piano and Winds (Mozart)
Quintet for Piano and Winds (Beethoven)